Hexic is a 2003 tile-matching puzzle video game developed by Carbonated Games for various platforms. In Hexic, the player tries to rotate hexagonal tiles to create certain patterns. The game is available on Windows, Xbox 360, Xbox One, Xbox Series X/S (via backwards compatibility) Windows Phone and the web. Many clones are available for Android and iOS. The game was designed by Alexey Pajitnov, best known as the creator of Tetris. While most earlier releases of the game were developed by Carbonated Games, the most recent version released for Windows and Windows Phone is developed by Other Ocean. The name is a portmanteau of the words "hectic" and "hexagon".

Gameplay 

The objective of Hexic is to rotate hexagonal pieces of various colours and clear them from the playfield by forming clusters or flowers.  Clusters are formed when three pieces of the same colour touch each other.  Pieces above the cleared pieces fall, potentially forming more clusters and causing chain reactions, and new pieces appear at the top of the playfield.  Bonuses are awarded for clearing more than three pieces at a time, and some pieces contain bonus stars, which yield extra points and can clear larger groups of pieces depending on how they are cleared.

The player can create a "gold-star" by arranging six like-coloured pieces into a hexagon or "flower", surrounding a piece of a different colour or type.  The surrounding pieces are cleared, and the center piece is replaced by a silver-star (unless the center piece was already a silver-star, in which case a new silver-star drops from the top).  A gold-star allows the player to rotate all surrounding pieces clockwise or counterclockwise.  Forming a flower of silver-stars changes the center piece into a black pearl, which allows the player to move three surrounding pieces in a Y or inverted Y pattern.  The ultimate goal of the game is to form a cluster or flower of black pearls, after which the game will end.

Bombs appear occasionally throughout the game.  A bomb is coloured like other pieces on the board and can be defused by rotating it into a cluster or flower of the same colour.  The counter on the bomb counts down with each move, and if allowed to reach zero, it explodes and the game is over.  Defusing a bomb by clustering it with at least one multiplier piece of the same colour causes all pieces of the same colour as the bomb to instantly clear from the playfield.

Hexic offers two variations on the standard Marathon mode: In Timed mode, a timer constantly counts down toward zero, and the game ends when time runs out.  The amount of time increases with successful clears, and resets to its maximum value when the player forms a starflower.  Creating starflowers also increases the maximum amount of time available, up to two minutes.

Survival mode challenges the player to completely clear the playfield.  Unlike in Marathon and Timed modes, clearing pieces from the playfield does not automatically cause new ones to fall from the top.  Instead, the player forms clusters and flowers until no more moves are possible, then any remaining pieces are locked in place and all open spaces are filled with new pieces.  Clearing clusters with bonus stars causes nearby locked pieces to become unlocked.  Forming a flower unlocks all pieces on the board and causes all pieces the same color as the center piece in the flower to clear from the board.  If the player successfully clears the entire playfield or survives fifty rounds, they win the game.  The game is over if all pieces on the playfield become locked.

The gameplay music from Hexic HD, released with the Xbox 360 in 2005, is from the album Hexophilia, an experiment in loop-based composition composed by Jerry Schroeder.

Development 

Hexic was originally developed by Carbonated Games and was released on the MSN Games online service in July 2003. A downloadable deluxe edition was also made available soon after. A variation of the game called Hexic HD was later developed by Microsoft Game Studios (since renamed Xbox Game Studios) and Carbonated Games for the Xbox 360, and comes preinstalled on all Xbox 360 hard drives as part of the Xbox Live Arcade service; it was previously only available by calling Microsoft's Service Center but is now available on the Xbox Marketplace as a free download. This version features online leaderboards and support for high-definition.

In August 2007, Microsoft released Hexic 2 on Xbox Live Arcade, providing new gameplay features and a competitive two-player mode.  Additionally, Hexic Deluxe for Tablet PC was released for  Windows XP Tablet PC Edition as part of the Education Pack for Tablet PC, allowing players to rotate pieces using a stylus.

Hexic comes with the Zune version 3.0 firmware, released September 16, 2008.

In March 2014, a completely redesigned version of the game was released for the Windows and Windows Phone as a Windows Store app. This version of the game was developed by Other Ocean and Microsoft Studios. It sported  a completely redesigned user interface, graphics, and sounds. The game was also Xbox LIVE enabled, meaning that players could earn Xbox LIVE achievements and take spot in leaderboards.

References 

 http://www.metacritic.com/game/xbox-360/hexic-hd/critic-reviews

External links 
 Hexic at MSN Games
 Hexic HD at Xbox.com

2003 video games
Alexey Pajitnov games
Microsoft games
Other Ocean Interactive games
Puzzle video games
Single-player video games
Video games developed in the United States
Video games scored by Yannis Brown
Windows games
Xbox 360 Live Arcade games
Carbonated Games games